The 2013 Royal Rumble was the 26th annual Royal Rumble professional wrestling pay-per-view (PPV) event produced by WWE. It took place on January 27, 2013, at the US Airways Center in Phoenix, Arizona. As has been customary since 1993, the Royal Rumble match winner received a world championship match at that year's WrestleMania. For the 2013 event, the winner received their choice to challenge for either the WWE Championship or World Heavyweight Championship at WrestleMania 29. It was the last Royal Rumble to feature the World Heavyweight Championship, which was unified with the WWE Championship in December, subsequently being the last Royal Rumble to include two eligible championships for the Rumble winner until the 2017 event.

Five matches were contested at the event, including one on the Pre-Show. In the main event, The Rock defeated CM Punk to win the WWE Championship, which was his first championship since 2002 that also ended Punk's reign at 434 days. On the undercard, John Cena won the 2013 Royal Rumble match, making him the seventh multiple Rumble winner. In another prominent match, Antonio Cesaro defeated The Miz to retain his United States Championship. Also on the card, Alberto Del Rio retained the World Heavyweight Championship against Big Show in a Last Man Standing match, and Team Hell No (Daniel Bryan and Kane) retained the WWE Tag Team Championship against Team Rhodes Scholars (Cody Rhodes and Damien Sandow).

Production

Background
The Royal Rumble is an annual gimmick pay-per-view (PPV), produced every January by WWE since 1988. It is one of the promotion's original four pay-per-views, along with WrestleMania, SummerSlam, and Survivor Series, dubbed the "Big Four". It is named after the Royal Rumble match, a modified battle royal in which the participants enter at timed intervals instead of all beginning in the ring at the same time. The match generally features 30 wrestlers and the winner traditionally earns a world championship match at that year's WrestleMania. For 2013, the winner could choose to challenge for either the WWE Championship or World Heavyweight Championship at WrestleMania 29. The 2013 event was the 26th event in the Royal Rumble chronology and was scheduled to be held on January 27, 2013, at the US Airways Center in Phoenix, Arizona.

Storylines 
The card consisted of five matches, including one on the Pre-Show. The matches resulted from scripted storylines, where wrestlers portrayed heroes, villains, or less distinguishable characters to build tension and culminated in a wrestling match or series of matches. Results were predetermined by WWE's writers, with storylines produced on their weekly television shows, Raw and SmackDown.

On July 23, 2012, during Raw 1000, The Rock announced that he would challenge for the WWE Championship at the Royal Rumble. Later that night, reigning champion CM Punk, Daniel Bryan, and John Cena each stated that they'd face The Rock as defending champion; later that night, Punk turned heel, attacking and laying out The Rock. Punk defended the championship for the rest of the year, while on December 23, 2012, The Rock tweeted to Punk that he was ready for the Royal Rumble. On the January 7 episode of Raw, Punk retained the WWE Championship against Ryback in a Tables, Ladders, and Chairs match after The Shield interfered. They also did during Punk's defence against Ryback and John Cena back at Survivor Series; this win secured Punk as the one who would defend against The Rock. On the January 21 episode of Raw while speaking about beating Punk at the Rumble, The Shield assaulted The Rock. After the assault, WWE Chairman Vince McMahon announced that if The Shield interfered in the match, Punk will be stripped of his title.

Big Show began a feud with Alberto Del Rio after humiliating Del Rio's personal ring announcer, Ricardo Rodriguez, sarcastically picking him to fight Big Show for the World Heavyweight Championship during "Champion's Choice Night" on the New Year's Eve 2013 episode of Raw, leading to a disqualification win for Big Show after Del Rio interfered. On the January 11, 2013 episode of SmackDown, Del Rio defeated Big Show in a Last Man Standing match for the championship. Three days later on Raw, Big Show announced that he would invoke his rematch clause at the pay-per-view. The week after, he made the match a Last Man Standing Match.

Event

Pre-show
The Royal Rumble Pre-Show match featured reigning United States Champion Antonio Cesaro defending his title against The Miz. During the match, Miz attempted a diving attack and injured his leg. Shortly after, Cesaro won after landing the Neutralizer.

Preliminary matches
As the PPV portion of the show began, a backstage segment was shown with Bret Hart wishing Alberto Del Rio good luck in his match. He then gave Ricardo Rodriguez a pair of his signature sunglasses.

The opening match on the PPV telecast (and second on the card overall) featured reigning World Heavyweight Champion Alberto Del Rio defending his title against Big Show in a Last Man Standing match. After Del Rio managed to beat the count after being chokeslammed through a table from an elevated position on the entrance stage, he managed to win when he locked in the Cross Armbreaker while Rodriguez duct taped Show's legs to the bottom rope.  Show was unable to free himself in time and was counted out.

Next, reigning WWE Tag Team Champions Team Hell No (Daniel Bryan and Kane) defended their titles against Team Rhodes Scholars (Cody Rhodes and Damien Sandow).  The match ended when Bryan applied the No! Lock on Sandow, forcing him to submit.

After that was the annual Royal Rumble match making it the first time in 7 years (since back in 2006) that the Royal Rumble Match would not be the main event of the namesake PPV.  Dolph Ziggler (as per the "Beat The Clock" stipulations from Raw) chose to enter first, followed by the surprise return of Chris Jericho at #2.  Another surprise entry, Goldust returned at #8, and spent most of his time battling with his half brother Cody Rhodes (entrant #3), who eventually eliminated him. Sheamus entered at #11, trying to become the fourth man to win back-to-back Rumbles, joining Hulk Hogan ('90-'91), Shawn Michaels ('95-'96), and "Stone Cold" Steve Austin ('97-'98). Kofi Kingston (the #4 entrant) provided a highlight, for when he was about to be eliminated, he jumped onto the back of recently eliminated Tensai, who put him on the Spanish announce table.  Kingston made it back onto the apron using John Bradshaw Layfield's chair like a pogo stick, but was quickly eliminated by Rhodes before reentering the ring.  Following this, The Godfather made a surprise appearance at #17, only to be immediately eliminated by Ziggler. John Cena entered at #19, quickly eliminating Rhodes and #10 entrant Heath Slater.  Daniel Bryan (#21) and Kane (#24) teamed up to eliminate #23 The Great Khali, but Bryan then eliminated Kane. When #22 Antonio Cesaro sent Bryan over the top rope, Kane caught him, only to drop him on the floor, eliminating him from the match.  Later, NXT tournament winner (and #16 entrant) Bo Dallas managed to eliminate Intercontinental Champion Wade Barrett (#18), leading to Barrett eliminating him and perform the Bull Hammer on Dallas, despite having already been eliminated. Ryback entered at #30 and eliminated three wrestlers in quick fashion.  Ziggler finally eliminated Jericho after nearly 48 minutes. The final four consisted of Ziggler, Sheamus, Cena and Ryback.  Sheamus eliminated Ziggler (who lasted nearly 50 minutes) and tried to execute the Broque Kick on Ryback, but Ryback managed to eliminate him.  After a few minutes of going back and forth, Cena then eliminated Ryback to win the Rumble, making him the fourth wrestler to win multiple Rumble matches (as he won the match in 2008 as well).

Main event match
The main event and fifth match on the card featured reigning WWE Champion CM Punk defending his title against The Rock. During the match, Rock attempted to perform a Rock Bottom through the Spanish announce table on Punk, but the table collapsed beneath them. Rock performed a Rock Bottom outside the ring, but Punk kicked out of a pin attempt. When Rock attempted to perform a People's Elbow, the arena went dark and Rock was attacked by an unknown entity, believed by the commentators to be The Shield. When the lights came back, the assailant(s) were nowhere to be found, and Rock had been driven through the English announce table, allowing Punk to get the winning pin.  As he celebrated with the title, WWE Chairman Vince McMahon came out and reminded Punk that if the Shield interfered (which while McMahon said he could not see it, he knew enough to realize what had happened) he would strip him of the title. Before he could however, the Rock said he wanted to take the title from Punk and told McMahon to instead restart the match. McMahon did so, and Rock won the match with a Spinebuster followed by a second People's Elbow, winning the WWE Championship for the eighth time and ending Punk's historic reign at 434 days.

Reception 
The event garnered 512,000 pay-per-view buys, the highest in four years.

Aftermath 
CM Punk, livid that his reign had ended, invoked his rematch clause at Elimination Chamber, but The Rock defeated him and retained the championship. Punk then challenged Cena for his contendership opportunity, which Cena accepted and defeated Punk. Punk later went to WrestleMania to try to end The Undertaker's undefeated streak. After Elimination Chamber, The Rock retired the spinner and bling belt (which was Cena's design for the championship and used by the company for the past eight years) and unveiled a new belt to represent the WWE Championship.

The following night on Raw, John Cena announced that he would challenge the reigning WWE Champion with his winning the Royal Rumble match. With The Rock retaining the championship, this would set up a rematch between The Rock and Cena from last year's WrestleMania. Cena would go on to win the match and the championship, making him a record 11-time WWE Champion.

The 2013 Royal Rumble was the last to feature the World Heavyweight Championship, as well as the last time it was a choice for the winner of the titular match, as the title was unified with the WWE Championship at December's TLC: Tables, Ladders & Chairs event, with the latter being renamed to WWE World Heavyweight Championship. It would in turn be the last Royal Rumble in which two world championships were eligible to be challenged for by the Rumble winner until the 2017 event.

Results

Royal Rumble 2013 entrances and eliminations 

 – Winner 

 1 – Barrett was already eliminated, but after that, Sin Cara pushed Bo Dallas over the top rope. As a result, both Cara and Barrett were able to eliminate Dallas.
 2 – Cesaro threw Bryan over the top rope, who was then caught on the outside by Kane (who had already been eliminated). Kane then dropped Bryan to the floor, eliminating him.

References

External links 
 

2013 in Arizona
Events in Phoenix, Arizona
2013
Professional wrestling in Phoenix, Arizona
2013 WWE pay-per-view events
January 2013 events in the United States